Nina Live! is the second video release by Filipina singer Nina. It is a recording of her most successful album Nina Live!, which was released in February 2005. It was released in karaoke-VCD and DVD formats on May 28, 2005 by Warner Music Philippines. Nina Live! is the first ever complete live DVD that was released in the Philippines. It contains the whole live session and several bonus features.

This material was also released as the live album Nina Live!.

Track listing
 "Sweet Thing"
 "Love Moves in Mysterious Ways"
 "Stay (With Me)"
 "Burn" (featuring Christian Bautista)
 "Through the Fire"
 "Fall for You"
 "Coloured Kisses" (featuring Trapp of Dice & K9)
 "Cool with You"
 "Constantly"
 "At Your Best"
 "Sunlight"
 "The Closer I Get to You" (featuring Thor)
 "Steep"
 "I Love You Goodbye"
 "I Can't Tell You Why"
 "Piano in the Dark"
 "Anything for You"
 "Time to Say Goodbye"

Bonus features
 "I Don't Want to Be Your Friend" (video)
 Videoke mode
 Biography
 Discography
 Photo gallery
 Interview with Nina

Audio modes
 Stereo
 Stereo karaoke
 5.1 Surround sound

Personnel
Credits were taken from Nina Live! liner notes.
 Marla Ancheta – director
 Dexter Ayala – bass guitar, back-up vocals
 Christian Bautista – lead vocals
 Chris Buenviaje – lead guitar, acoustic guitar, electric guitar, back-up vocals
 Leo Espocia – drums, back-up vocals
 Nina Girado – lead vocals
 Neil C. Gregorio – album producer
 Ricky R. Ilacad – executive producer
 Rico Sobrevinas – saxophone, back-up vocals
 Thor – lead vocals
 Trapp – rap vocals
 Derek Tupas – keyboards, back-up vocals

Certifications

References

2005 video albums
Concert films
Nina Girado video albums
Live video albums
2005 live albums